Doris Ellen Mortimer (28 July 1898 – 16 February 1947) was a British stockbroker. While not the first woman stockbroker in the UK, in 1923 she became the first woman to be admitted to a British stockbroking association or exchange.

Early life and education
Mortimer was born in Exeter, Devon, to Thomas and Jessy Mortimer. Stockbroking had been the family business for several generations, with W. Mortimer & Sons first established in 1842 at 14 Bedford Circus, Exeter. After the outbreak of World War I and the enlistment of the male staff Mortimer left school to assist in the office, and a short time after the war ended she succeeded her father as senior partner.

Career
Women were deliberately excluded from stockbroking during the time period that Mortimer began working in the industry. Stockbrokers in London were expected to become members of the London Stock Exchange (which would not accept its first female members until 1973), while membership of the UK's regional exchanges was collectively overseen by the Association of Provincial Stock and Share Brokers (APSSB). 

British women in stockbroking had to work in so-called "outside houses" (or by themselves, as "outside agents") – either by relying on male exchange members to conduct trades on their behalf (as Amy Bell did), or by specialising in financial products which were not traded on exchanges (as Gordon Holmes did). Mortimer became the APSSB's first woman member in 1923, and the Exeter exchange became the first British stock exchange with a female member. The feminist newspaper The Vote called her "the only 'inside' woman broker in this country."

Later life
Mortimer's later life and career is poorly documented. In the 1939 England & Wales Register, Mortimer's occupation is listed as "Stocks Shares Broker Incapacitated W.V.S.". She never married or had children, and lived at the Mortimer family home at 26-27 St Leonard's Road, Exeter, until her death at the age of 48. She left behind an estate worth £19,830 (roughly equivalent to £800,000 in 2020), and was survived by her widowed mother.

See also 
 Oonagh Keogh – The first woman to be admitted to Ireland's national stock exchange in Dublin, in 1925

References 

British stockbrokers
Women stockbrokers
1898 births
1947 deaths